William Blackburn "Warbler" Wilson (November 28, 1878 – December 8, 1958) was a college football player and city recorder.

College football
Wilson was an All-Southern quarterback.

South Carolina
Wilson came from Rock Hill, South Carolina, and played as a backup for the South Carolina Gamecocks in 1896.

Sewanee
In part due to Luke Lea, Wilson came to Sewanee:The University of the South as a law student. He was a prominent quarterback from 1897 to 1900.

1898
In 1898 he led the Tigers to an undefeated year, playing through a broken leg in the 19–4 victory over Vanderbilt.

1899
Wilson was the quarterback and a key member of the undefeated 1899 "Iron Men" who won five road games by shutout in six days. Supposedly he also played with a broken leg for 45 minutes in the last game of the road trip of '99, against Ole Miss.  A documentary film about this team and Wilson's role was released in 2022 called "Unrivaled:  Sewanee 1899."

1900
He was captain of the team in 1900.

City recorder
He was the first city recorder in his native town of Rock Hill.

References

1878 births
1958 deaths
American football quarterbacks
South Carolina Gamecocks football players
Sewanee Tigers football players
Players of American football from South Carolina
People from Rock Hill, South Carolina
All-Southern college football players
19th-century players of American football